State leaders in the 18th century BC – State leaders in the 16th century BC – State leaders by year
This is a list of state leaders in the 17th century BC (1700–1601 BC).

Africa: Northeast

Egypt: Second Intermediate Period

Thirteenth Dynasty of the Second Intermediate Period (complete list) –
Merneferre Ay, King (c.1701–1677 BC)
Merhotepre Ini, King (1677–1675 BC)
Sankhenre Sewadjtu, King (1675–1672 BC)
Mersekhemre Ined, King (c.1670 BC)
Sewadjkare Hori, King (c.1666 BC)
Merkawre Sobekhotep, King (c.1662 BC)
Mershepsesre Ini II, King (mid-17th century BC)
Sewahenre Senebmiu, King (post-1660 BC)
Merkheperre, King (c.1650s BC)
Merkare, King (c.1650s BC)
Sewadjare Mentuhotep, King (c.1650s BC)
Seheqenre Sankhptahi, King (c.1650s BC)

Fourteenth Dynasty of the Second Intermediate Period (complete list) –
Sehebre, King (c.1704–1699)

Fifteenth Dynasty of the Second Intermediate Period (complete list) –
Semqen, King (late-17th century BC)
Aperanat, King (late-17th century BC)
Sakir-Har, King (late-17th century BC)
Khyan, King (c.1610–1580 BC)

Sixteenth Dynasty of the Theban region in Upper Egypt: Second Intermediate Period (complete list) –
Djehuti, King (c.1650 BC)
Sobekhotep VIII, King (1645–1629 BC)
Neferhotep III, King (1629–1628 BC)
Seankhenre Mentuhotepi, King (1628–1627 BC)
Nebiryraw I, King (1627–1601 BC)
Nebiriau II, King (c.1600 BC)
Semenre, King (c.1600 BC)
Bebiankh, King (c.1600–1588 BC)

Abydos Dynasty of the Second Intermediate Period (complete list) –
Senebkay, King (17th century BC)
Wepwawetemsaf, King (17th century BC)
Pantjeny, King (17th century BC)
Snaaib, King (17th century BC)

Asia

Asia: East 

China

Shang, China (complete list) –
Tang, King (c.1675–1646 BC)
Da Ding, possible King (17th century BC)
Tai Jia, King (c.1602–1590 BC)

Asia: Southeast
Vietnam
Hồng Bàng dynasty (complete list) –
Ly line, (c.1712–c.1632 BC)
Khôn line, (c.1632–c.1431 BC)

Asia: West

Assyria: Old Period

Babylonia

Elam

Hittite Empire

References 

State Leaders
-
17th-century BC rulers